Leslie Thomas Manser, VC (11 May 1922 – 31 May 1942) was a British bomber pilot and a recipient of the Victoria Cross, which was awarded posthumously following an attack on the German city of Cologne.

Early life
Leslie Thomas Manser was born in New Delhi, India, during his father's employment as an engineer with the Post and Telegraph Department and, when the family returned to Britain, they settled in Radlett, Hertfordshire. He was a pupil of Victoria Boys' School, Kurseong, Darjeeling and Aldenham School, Elstree, Hertfordshire.

Royal Air Force
Manser was accepted by the Royal Air Force (RAF) in August 1940, and was commissioned as a pilot officer in May 1941. After a navigational course and final operational training at No. 14 Operational Training Unit, RAF Cottesmore, he was posted to No. 50 Squadron operating the Handley Page Hampden at RAF Swinderby, Lincolnshire, on 27 August.

Two days after joining his squadron, Manser experienced his first operation: as a second pilot, he took part in a bombing raid on Frankfurt. During the next two months he flew six more sorties against targets including Berlin, Hamburg and Karlsruhe, before being posted to No. 25 Operational Training Unit, Finningley on 7 November and a month later posted back to No. 14 Operational Training Unit as an instructor.

Manser served briefly with No. 420 Squadron RCAF (Hampdens) from March to April 1942 when he rejoined No. 50 Squadron then operating from RAF Skellingthorpe, and converted to the new Avro Manchester medium bomber. He piloted one of the new aircraft during a leaflet drop over Paris, and flew a further five sorties during April and May. Manser was promoted to flying officer on 6 May.

Participating in Operation Millenium, a bombing raid on Cologne on the night of 30 May 1942, Manser was captain and first pilot of Avro Manchester bomber 'D' for Dog. As he came over the target, his aircraft was caught in searchlights and although he bombed the target successfully from  it was hit by flak. In an effort to escape the anti-aircraft fire he took violent evasive action, this reduced his altitude to only  but he did not escape the flak until he was clear of the city. By this time the rear gunner was wounded, the front cabin full of smoke and the port engine overheating. Rather than abandon the aircraft and be captured, Manser tried to get the aircraft and crew to safety. The port engine then burst into flames, burning the wing and reducing airspeed to a dangerously low level. The crew made preparations to abandon the aircraft, by then barely controllable and with a crash inevitable. The aircraft was by now over Belgium, and Manser ordered the crew to bail out but refused the offer of a parachute for himself. He remained at the controls and sacrificed himself in order to save his crew. As the crew parachuted down they saw the bomber crash in flames into a dyke at Bree, Belgium, north east of Genk.

Pilot Officer Barnes was taken prisoner, but Sergeant Baveystock, Pilot Officer Horsley, Sergeant King, Sergeant Mills and Sergeant Naylor all evaded capture and made their way back to the United Kingdom. The testimonies of the five evaders were instrumental in the posthumous award of the Victoria Cross for Manser. The citation for the award read:

Manser is buried at the Heverlee War Cemetery in Leuven, Belgium.

Manser was the brother-in-law of British Army captain John Neil Randle, who was posthumously awarded the Victoria Cross in 1944.

Legacy
On part of the old RAF Skellingthorpe airfield from which Manser flew his last sortie, a new primary school was built. It was opened in 1981 and named the Leslie Manser Primary School. On 31 June 2004 a Memorial to Manser was unveiled in natural domain the "Zig", Stamprooierbroek near Molenbeersel, Kinrooi in the north-east of Belgium.

Manser's Victoria Cross is on display in the Lord Ashcroft Gallery at the Imperial War Museum, London.

References

External links
 CWGC entry
 information at Victoria & Dow Hill Schools website

1922 births
1942 deaths
British World War II recipients of the Victoria Cross
Royal Air Force recipients of the Victoria Cross
Royal Air Force officers
Royal Air Force pilots of World War II
British World War II bomber pilots
Aviators killed by being shot down
Royal Air Force personnel killed in World War II
Royal Air Force Volunteer Reserve personnel of World War II
People from New Delhi
People educated at Aldenham School
People from Radlett
Aviators killed in aviation accidents or incidents in Belgium
Victims of aviation accidents or incidents in 1942
Burials at Heverlee Commonwealth War Graves Commission Cemetery
British people in colonial India
Military personnel of British India